Sanjar Tursunov may refer to:
 Sanzhar Tursunov, Uzbekistani footballer
 Sanjar Tursunov (boxer), Uzbekistani boxer